, there were about 2,600 electric vehicles in Nebraska, equivalent to 0.2% of all vehicles in the state.

Government policy
, the state government offers tax rebates of up to $4,000 for electric vehicle purchases.

, the state government charges a $75 annual registration fee for electric vehicles.

Charging stations
, there were 181 public charging station locations with 383 charging ports in Nebraska.

The Infrastructure Investment and Jobs Act, signed into law in November 2021, allocates  to charging stations in Nebraska.

, the state government recognizes the following highways as potential "alternative fuel corridors", with charging stations every : I-80, US-6, and NE-31.

By region

Lincoln
, there were about 500 electric vehicles registered in Lincoln.

Omaha

References

Nebraska
Road transportation in Nebraska